John Edward Loyd (May 5, 1875 – March 4, 1943) was an American college football player and physician.

College football
Loyd played for Richmond College from 1892 to 1895 and for the Virginia Cavaliers from 1898 to 1900. He was captain of the team in 1900, a year in which Virginia had a claim to a Southern championship and defeated Sewanee to give the school its first loss since 1897. Loyd was thrice selected to the All-Southern team as a tackle.

Physician
He was once resident physician at the Chesapeake and Ohio Hospital at Clifton Forge.

References

1875 births
1943 deaths
Physicians from Virginia
All-Southern college football players
American football tackles
People from Bedford County, Virginia
Players of American football from Virginia
Virginia Cavaliers football players
Richmond Spiders football players
19th-century players of American football
People from Clifton Forge, Virginia